Hanko railway station (abbrev. Hnk) is a railway station in the port city of Hanko, Finland along the Hanko–Hyvinkää railway.

The current station building represents the postfunctionalism of the 1950s. The building was completed in 1952 and it was designed by architect Jarl Ungern.

References

External links 

Railway stations in Uusimaa
Railway station